The Party for the Commonwealth of Canada (also known as the Party for the Republic of Canada) fielded eighteen candidates in the 1994 Quebec provincial election, none of whom were elected. This party was the Canadian branch of Lyndon LaRouche's movement. Information about the party candidates may be found on this page.

Candidates

Mercier: Julie Laliberté
Julie Laliberté received 173 votes (0.56%), finishing seventh against Parti Québécois candidate Robert Perreault.

Rosemont: Normand Bélanger
Normand Bélanger ran for the Commonwealth Party in two federal and two provincial elections. In addition to supporting Lyndon LaRouche's theories, he also called for classical music to be taught starting at the primary grades in the Quebec public school system.

References

Candidates in Quebec provincial elections
Quebec 1994